Goran Daničić (14 December 1962 – 10 February 2021) was a Serbian actor. He appeared in more than fifty films since 1982.

Selected filmography

References

External links 
 

1962 births
2021 deaths
People from Užice
Serbian male film actors
Dr. Branivoj Đorđević Award winners